The Mansfield Township School District is a community public school district that serves students in pre-kindergarten through sixth grade from Mansfield Township, in Warren County, New Jersey, United States.

As of the 2018–19 school year, the district, comprised of one school, had an enrollment of 607 students and 56.8 classroom teachers (on an FTE basis), for a student–teacher ratio of 10.7:1.

The district is classified by the New Jersey Department of Education as being in District Factor Group "FG", the fourth-highest of eight groupings. District Factor Groups organize districts statewide to allow comparison by common socioeconomic characteristics of the local districts. From lowest socioeconomic status to highest, the categories are A, B, CD, DE, FG, GH, I and J.

Public school students in seventh through twelfth grades attend the schools of the Warren Hills Regional School District, which also serves students from the municipalities of Franklin Township, Washington Borough and Washington Township, along with those from Oxford Township (for 9-12 only, attending on a tuition basis). Schools in the district (with 2018–19 enrollment data from the National Center for Education Statistics) are 
Warren Hills Regional Middle School with 542 students in grades 7 and 8 (located in Washington Borough) and 
Warren Hills Regional High School with 1,205 students in grades 9 - 12 (located in Washington Township).

Awards and recognition
For the 2005-06 school year, the district was recognized with the "Best Practices Award" by the New Jersey Department of Education for its "Design Your Dream House" Mathematics program at Mansfield Township Elementary School.

School
Mansfield Township Elementary School serves students in pre-Kindergarten through sixth grade. The school had an enrollment of 609 students as of the 2018–19 school year.
John Melitsky, Principal

Administration
Core members of the district's administration are:
Anthony Giordano, Superintendent
Paul DeAngelo, Business Administrator / Board Secretary

Board of education
The district's board of education, comprised of nine members, sets policy and oversees the fiscal and educational operation of the district through its administration. As a Type II school district, the board's trustees are elected directly by voters to serve three-year terms of office on a staggered basis, with three seats up for election each year held (since 2012) as part of the November general election. The board appoints a superintendent to oversee the district's day-to-day operations and a business administrator to supervise the business functions of the district.

References

External links
Mansfield Township Elementary School

School Data for the Mansfield Township Elementary School, National Center for Education Statistics
Warren Hills Regional School District

Mansfield Township, Warren County, New Jersey
New Jersey District Factor Group FG
Public elementary schools in New Jersey
School districts in Warren County, New Jersey